The Naked Chef is a BBC Two television cooking programme starring Jamie Oliver. It originally ran for three series plus three Christmas specials, and was produced by Optomen Television for the BBC. The show was Oliver's television debut, and was noted for its use of jumpy, close-up camera work, and the presenter's relaxed style.

The programme was credited with inspiring men to cook due to Oliver's "blokey" approach.

Each episode took its theme from a social situation or event in Oliver's life, such as a hen night or babysitting. In series 1 and 2, except the Christmas specials, Oliver was filmed cooking at a home paid for by the BBC. In series 3, the kitchen locations shifted to other venues.

Episodes
† Aired as a special

Series 1 (1999)

Series 2 (2000)

Series 3 (2001)

References

External links
 

1990s British cooking television series
2000s British cooking television series
1999 British television series debuts
2001 British television series endings
British cooking television shows
Television series by All3Media
BBC Television shows